Acetone is an album by the American alternative rock band Acetone, released in 1997. It was the band's first album for Neil Young's Vapor Records; Acetone's previous label, Vernon Yard, had declared bankruptcy. The album was produced by Scott Campbell and Acetone.

The band supported the album by opening for Spiritualized on its North American tour.

Critical reception

Pitchfork wrote that "[Richie] Lee's lyric sheet may have been filled with dejection ... but he always sang as if he was looking you in the eyes." The Times declared that "Mark Lightcap's country-tinged guitars are simply gorgeous."

Noting that Acetone "belong somewhere in the slowcore/sadcore area," The Sunday Times thought that "their music isn't just unhurried, it's completely indifferent to the passing of time." The Guardian praised the "homespun, half-speed ballads." The San Antonio Express-News deemed the album "atmospheric pop with a hint of guitar twang and the feeling of a slow-motion undertow."

AllMusic thought that the album "finds the trio sinking deeper into a well of despair, with nothing but sparse guitar pickings, cracked vocals, and shambling rock figures to help." MusicHound Rock: The Essential Album Guide wrote: "Alternately draining and invigorating, the sheer listlessness of songs such as 'Might as Well' and 'Good Life' is resuscitated by the drunk and confident stare of jazz-bar reflection."

Track listing

Personnel
Steve Hadley - drums
Richie Lee - vocals, bass
Mark Lightcap - guitar, vocals

References

1997 albums